The following is an alphabetical list of notable musicians using Amharic vocals in their musical compositions. The Amharic language is predominantly used in Ethiopia.

List of musicians

A 
 Abatte Barihun
 Abby Lakew
 Alemayehu Eshete
 Alemu Aga
 Amsal Mitike
 Ashenafi Kebede
 Asnaketch Worku
 Aster Aweke

B 
 Bahru Kegne
 Berhana
 Betty G
 Bizunesh Bekele

E 
 Eténèsh Wassié
 Eden Alene

G 
 Gigi

H 
 Hagit Yaso

J 
 Jeremy Cool Habash

K 
 Kassa Tessema
 Kuku Sebsebe

M 
 Mahmoud Ahmed
 Mary Armede
 Meklit Hadero
 Menelik Wossenachew
 Minyeshu
 Muluken Melesse
 Munit Mesfin

N 
 Neway Debebe

T 
 Tamrat Desta
 Teddy Afro
 Telela Kebede
 Tessema Eshete
 The Weeknd
 Tigist Shibabaw
 Tilahun Gessesse
 Tsedenia Gebremarkos

V 
 Vahe Tilbian

Z 
 Zeritu Kebede

References 

Ethiopian musicians
Lists of musicians by nationality
Amharic-language singers